Giotti Victoria is an Italian pickup truck, van and microcars manufacturer. This company is also cars importer by DFSK Motor under "Fencon" brand.

History 
This industry was founded by Lorenzo Giotti and Federico Giotti brothers in 2007: his factory was located in Barberino Val d'Elsa and his legal headquarters is in Poggibonsi. Furthermore
this company trades in used trucks that have been repaired by their mechanics.
Giotti Victoria is main sponsor of Giotti Victoria-Savini Due cycling professional team.

Produced pickup trucks
Produced Gladiator line's pickup trucks series are named Evo and Top, which has various type including van too: Top 2.8, Top double cab and Top electric.

Produced cars
Produced cars are Giotti Victoria Ginko and Giotti Victoria Gyppo.

Imported cars
Imported cars series are named Glory, which has various type: 500, 500e, 580 and iX5.

Notes 

motor vehicle manufacturers of Italy
Car manufacturers of Italy
Italian companies established in 2007
Vehicle manufacturing companies established in 2007
Companies based in Tuscany